The Ulster Intermediate Hurling Championship is an inter county competition between the Intermediate Hurling county teams in the province of Ulster in Ireland. The series of games are organised by the Ulster Council.

The winners of the Ulster Intermediate Hurling Championship each year progress to play the other provincial champions for a chance to win the All-Ireland Intermediate Hurling Championship. The competition has not been played since 1999. In 2000, Down and London took part in open draw portion of the All-Ireland Championship. Hurling is not strong enough in the province to keep the championship in existence. Only Antrim is capable of fielding a second team. In fact, prior to the establishment of this championship, Antrim competed in the Leinster Intermediate Hurling Championship from 1961 until 1965.

Top winners

Roll of honour

See also
 Munster Intermediate Hurling Championship
 Leinster Intermediate Hurling Championship
 Connacht Intermediate Hurling Championship

2